Hans-Ulrich Schmincke (born 21 October 1937) is a notable German volcanologist.

Formation 
Hans-Ulrich Schmincke studied between 1957 and 1964 geology and petrology at different universities in Germany and the USA: Universität Göttingen, Albert-Ludwigs-Universität Freiburg, RWTH Aachen as well as Johns Hopkins University and University of California, Santa Barbara

Employment
He was a research fellow at University of Tübingen in 1964–65 and at University of Heidelberg 1965–1969.

He worked at the Ruhr University Bochum (1969–90), before being the chief of the department of volcanology and petrology (1990–2003) of the "GEOMAR Helmholtz-Zentrum für Ozeanforschung Kiel" (former "Leibniz-Instituts für Meereswissenschaften", IFM-Geomar), University of Kiel.

Hans-Ulrich Schmincke was secretary general of the International Association of Volcanology and Chemistry of the Earth's Interior (IAVCEI, 1983–91).

Publications (selection)
Schmincke was co-author with RV Fisher of the book Pyroclastic Rocks, in 1984. His book Volcanism, first edition in 1986 (under the German title “Vulkanismus”), is still one of the most important books regarding this subject. The first edition was published in 1986; its second edition appeared 2000 with translations into English (2004) and Japanese (2009, with considerable additions); the third edition appeared 2010.
 
He is also the founder of the well-known volcanological journal Bulletin of Volcanology of which he was the editor in chief from 1985-95.

Additionally, he published over 300 articles re. volcanology and petrology.

Special interests
He did a lot of research on German volcanoes, esp. the Eifel volcanoes.

The Canary Islands are also among his favorite subjects of research.

And in 1993, he did field work in China at the Paektusan volcano and was the first to make this big caldera known to the western world.

Honours
He was honoured e.g. with the Leibniz-Preis der Deutschen Forschungsgemeinschaft (1991), with the Thorarinsson Medal of the IAVCEI (1993), with the Hans-Stille Medal (2001) and with the Gustav-Steinmann Medal (2012).

Selected publications 
 Note: reprint. The same book has  (Primus Verlag) for trade outside the WBG publishing company. English version: Hans-Ulrich Schmincke: Volcanism, scientific book company 2000,

Notes and references

External links
 (in German)
 (in German)
 (in German)

20th-century German geologists
German volcanologists
Academic staff of the University of Kiel
Living people
1937 births
Hans-Stille-Medaille winners
Gustav-Steinmann-Medaille winners
Thorarinsson Medalists
21st-century German geologists